Sarvanovsky is the largest island in Lake Umbozero. It is part of Kirovsk Urban Okrug, Murmansk Oblast, Russia.

References

Lake islands of Russia
Islands of Murmansk Oblast